Introduction, Passacaglia and Fugue in E minor, Op. 127, is an extended composition for organ by Max Reger, composed in 1913 and dedicated to Karl Straube who played the premiere in Breslau on 24 September. It was published in November that year in Berlin by Bote & Bock.

History 
Reger composed the work in Meiningen, Thuringia, Germany in April and May 1913. He wrote the organ piece with the intent for it to be performed for organ concerts, rather than for church services, called "in grand style" ("ganz großen Stils"). Reger composed the work on a commission for the opening celebrations of a new concert hall in Breslau, the Centennial Hall (Jahrhunderthalle).

Reger revived organ concert music which had become unfashionable. In Karl Straube, he had an organist and friend who was able to play technically difficult music, and to influence the composition. The markings for expression are believed to have been influenced by Straube. Reger dedicated the work to Straube who played the first performance in Breslau on 24 September 1913. The composition was published in November 2013 in Berlin by Ed. Bote & G. Bock.

Music 
The work is structured in three sections, the introduction, a passacaglia with 26 variations, and a double fugue. The variations build in intensity towards the fugue.

The organist David Goode wrote that the introduction begins with dense chromaticism and flourishing figuration. The passacaglia is based on a theme which uses eleven of the twelve notes of the chromatic scale. 26 variations are grouped in the sections: a first, intensifying speed and texture, a second as a meditative centre, and a third, again intensifying towards the fugue. He notes Reger's "effective control of pace and excitement".

Manuscript and edition 
The Max-Reger-Institute holds Reger's manuscript of the work which was intended for the engraver.

Legacy 
The Canadian composer Healey Willan heard the work, played by his friend Dalton Baker. When Baker said "that such a work could only have been composed by a 'German philosophical mind'" Willan was challenged to write a composition of the same structure, completed in 1916.

References

Bibliography

External links 
 
 Max Reger / Introduction, Passacaglia and Fugue for organ in E minor, Op. 127 AllMusic
 Max Reger (1873-1916) / Organ Works Naxos Records

Compositions for organ
1913 compositions
Compositions by Max Reger
Compositions in E minor